Under Construction is the fourth studio album by American rapper Missy Elliott, released by The Goldmind Inc. and Elektra Records on November 12, 2002, in the United States. The album was primarily produced by Timbaland, with additional production by Craig Brockman, Nisan Stewart, Errol "Poppi" McCalla and Elliott herself.

The album debuted at number three on the US Billboard 200 chart, selling 359,000 copies in its first week. It was also certified double platinum by the Recording Industry Association of America (RIAA). The album received Grammy Award nominations for Best Rap Album and Album of the Year. Elliott dedicated the album to Aaliyah (who had died on August 25, 2001) and to victims of the September 11 attacks.

Controversy
The album's third single was intended to be a newly recorded remix of "Pussycat" with guest vocals by Janet Jackson and featuring Lil' Kim. Elliott's label felt the song was too explicit to release and plans were withdrawn.

Reception

Under Construction received general acclaim from critics. At Metacritic, it earned an average score of 81 out of 100, based on 19 reviews, indicating "universal acclaim". The album was included in the book 1001 Albums You Must Hear Before You Die.

"It still sounds incredibly fresh, in all meanings of the word," observed the Yeah Yeah Yeahs' guitarist, Nick Zinner. "Karen [O, Yeah Yeah Yeahs' singer] and I listened to it all the time. We used to play it before we'd go onstage... 'Funky Fresh Dressed' is my favourite track. I don't know what else to say other than it's amazing."

Year-end lists

Commercial performance
Under Construction debuted at number three on the US Billboard 200 chart, selling 259,000 copies in its first week. The album stayed on the chart for a total of 36 weeks. On July 14, 2003, the album was certified double platinum by the Recording Industry Association of America (RIAA) for sales of over two million copies in the United States. By November 2015, the album had sold 2,142,000 copies in the US.

Track listing

Notes
  denotes co-producer

Production
 Executive producers – Missy Elliott, Timbaland
 Producers – Missy Elliott, Timbaland, Craig Brockman, Errol "Poppi" McCalla
 Vocal assistance – Tweet, Lisa Crawford
 Engineers – Jeff Allen, Carlos "El Loco" Bedoya, Josh Butler, Jimmy Douglass, Guru, Mike "Hitman" Wilson
 Assistant engineers – Marc Stephen Lee, Steve Penny, David Snyder, Cory Williams
 Mixing – Jimmy Douglass, Timbaland
 Mixing assistance – Steamy
 Mastering – Herb Powers
 Design and art direction – Anita Marisa Boriboon, Lili Picou
 Photography – Roberto Fantauzzi

Charts

Weekly charts

Year-end charts

Certifications

References

External links 

2002 albums
Missy Elliott albums
Albums produced by Craig Brockman
Albums produced by Missy Elliott
Albums produced by Timbaland
Elektra Records albums